But Never Jam Today was a 1979 musical with music by Bert Keyes and Bob Larimer, lyrics by Larimer, and a book by both Larimer and Vinnette Carroll. The musical is based on the works of Lewis Carroll, and takes its title from the "jam tomorrow" discussion in Carroll's 1871 novel Through the Looking-Glass.

Background
A musical by Micki Grant entitled Alice was the previous musical work of Alice's adventures, which premiered on May 31, 1978 in Philadelphia in a pre-Broadway tryout.

Production
It opened on July 31, 1979, at the Longacre Theatre, produced by Arch Nadler, Anita MacShane, and The Urban Arts Theatre at the Longacre Theatre. The show closed on August 5, 1979, after only eight performances.

The show was directed and devised by Vinnette Carroll, with choreography by Talley Beatty, musical direction and incidental music by Donald O. Johnston, set and costume design by William Schroder, lighting design by Ken Billington, choral arrangement and vocal preparation by Cleavant Derricks, sound design by T. Richard Fitzgerald, orchestrations by Bert Keyes, special orchestration by H. B. Barnum and Larry Black, dance music by Barnum, production manager Robert L. Borod, stage manager Robert Charles, and press by Alpert/Levine and Mark Goldstaub.

The show starred Marilynn Winbush (Alice), Cleavant Derricks, (Caterpillar, Cook, Tweedledee, Seven of Spades), Lynne Thigpen (Persona Non Grata), Lynne Clifton-Allen (Black Queen), Jeffrey Anderson-Gunter (White Rabbit, Cheshire Cat, Mock Turtle), Reginald VelJohnson (Duchess, Humpty-Dumpty, King of Hearts), Jai Oscar St. John (Mad Hatter, Tweedledum, Two of Spades), Sheila Ellis (March Hare, Five of Spades, Cook), Celestine DeSaussure (Dormouse, Cook), and Charlene Harris (White Queen, Queen of Hearts). The Mushrooms were Brenda Braxton, Clayton Strange, Sharon K. Brooks, Garry Q. Lewis, Celestine DeSaussure, and Jeffrey Anderson-Gunter. The Guards were Clayton Strange and Garry Q. Lewis.

Scenes
 Act I
Scene 1 - Down the rabbit hole
Scene 2 - Interview with a Caterpillar (square 1)
Scene 3 - The Black Queen (Square 2)
Scene 4 - The Kitchen of the Duchess (Square 3)
Scene 5 - The Cheshire Cat
Scene 6 - A Mad Party (Square 4)
Scene 7 - The White Queen (Square 5)
Scene 8 - Humpty Dumpty
Scene 9 - Tweedledee and Tweedledum (Square 6)
 Act II
Scene 1 - The Queen of Hearts's croquet ground
Scene 2 - The Queen's Dungeon
Scene 3 - The Mock Turtle (Square 7)
Scene 4 - The Queen's dungeon
Scene 5 - An examination (Square 8)
Scene 6 - Alice's reward
Scene 7 - The daydream ends

Musical numbers

Act 1
Curiouser and Curiouser - Alice
Twinkle, Twinkle Little Star - Caterpillar, Persona Non Grata, Company
Long Live The Queen - Black Queen, Alice
A Real Life Lullabye - Duchess, Cooks
The More I See People - Cheshire Cat
My Little Room - Alice
But Never Jam Today - White Queen, Alice
Riding For A Fall - Persona Non Grata, Humpty Dumpty, Alice
All The Same To Me- Tweedledee, Tweedledum
I've Got My Orders - Alice

Act 2
God Could Give Me Anything - Two, Five, Seven of Spades
But Never Jam Today (Reprise) - Company, Persona Non Grata
I Like To Win - Alice
And They All Call The Hatter Mad - Persona Non Grata
Jumping From Rock To Rock - Mock Turtle, Alice, Company
They - Two, Five, Seven of Spades
Long Live The Company (Reprise)  - Company
I've Got My Orders (Reprise) - Alice, Company

Bibliography

 "The Best Plays of 1979-1980". Dodd, Mead & Company, 1980, pp. 357–359. .

References

External links
 Listen to songs from the show
 
 

1979 musicals
Broadway musicals
Works based on Alice in Wonderland